Northwestern College (NWC and informally Northwestern Iowa) is a private Christian liberal arts college in Orange City, Iowa. It is affiliated with the Reformed Church in America and enrolls more than 1,500 students. In addition to approximately 1,000 students in bachelor's degree programs, the college has a growing graduate school, which includes a master's degree program in physician assistant studies launched in June 2020. Northwestern began as an academy in 1882. It became a junior college in 1928 and a four-year institution in 1961.

Northwestern has been accredited by the Higher Learning Commission since 1953.  In addition, the athletic training, business, education, nursing and social work programs are accredited by their respective accreditation organizations.

College community
Northwestern College is an educational institution made up of approximately 1,500 students and 300 faculty and staff   located in Orange City, a rural community of 6004 residents in Sioux County, Iowa.  The campus is a few blocks south of the downtown area, centered on the intersection of State Highway 10 and Albany Avenue.

Leadership

Northwestern College is governed by a board of trustees chaired by Carl Wynja.  Approximately half of its members represent the RCA denomination.  There is also a Student Government Association.

Greg Christy serves as the president of the Northwestern College.  He is assisted by a leadership team called the President's Cabinet.

President Christy began serving as president of NWC in 2008.  He had previously served as the vice president for institutional advancement at Dakota Wesleyan University in Mitchell, South Dakota, an institution he served at for 12 years.  Prior to that, he had held positions on the staffs of South Dakota State University and Iowa State University.  Christy holds a bachelor's degree in management from Simpson College and a master's degree in physical education and sports management from Western Illinois University.

Campus culture

Northwestern College identifies itself as a "Reformed, evangelical and ecumenical" community, viewing these three Christian theological perspectives as complementary and drawing strengths from each perspective to fulfill its mission.  Chapel is offered two days a week. There is also a student-led time of praise and worship on Sunday evenings.

As an intentionally Reformed, Christian academic community, NWC has adopted a Vision for Learning "rooted in the wisdom of the Bible" where they "view learning as worship, using our minds to better understand, serve and love God's world."  An institutional commitment to engagement is an important part of that, by "participating in God's redemptive work" and seeking "to respond to God's call to share the gospel, care for creation and serve Christ in everyone."  As a logical outgrowth of that vision, an education at NWC is designed to prepare students to:
 Trust, love and worship God
 Engage ideas
 Connect knowledge and experience
 Respond to God's call

Demographics
There were a total of 1,546 students at the start of the 2020–21 school year. Roughly one-third of the student population attending NWC comes from the state of Iowa and more than half of its students come from four Midwestern states: Iowa (539 students), South Dakota (123), Minnesota (80) and Nebraska (64). The top six Christian denominations represented at the college are:  Reformed/RCA (310), Evangelical Free (64), Lutheran (157, Baptist (44), Methodist/Wesleyan (36) and Roman Catholic (57).  Approximately 17% of residential undergraduate students are identified as ethnic minorities or international students.

Student residences

Colenbrander Hall - Men
North Suites - Men
Fern Smith Hall - Women
Stegenga Hall - Women
Hospers Hall - Men
Bolks Apartments
Courtyard Village Apartments

Student groups and clubs on campus
 Student Government Association (SGA) - A group of elected student representatives and faculty advisers gather weekly to discuss issues about campus and how to improve campus life.
 The International Club (I-Club) - The International Club is open to both international and American students who form friendships and learn about one another's cultures through meetings, events and trips.
 Red Raider Club - Composed of current and former athletes and Red Raider fans, the Red Raider Club supports Northwestern student-athletes and helps fund equipment and other athletics department purchases.
 Discipleship Groups (D-Groups) - Student-led D-Groups meet weekly in each residence hall and student apartment complex to pray, study the Bible, and provide a place to talk about one's Christian faith.
 The Beacon - A weekly student newspaper covers topics of interest to the Northwestern community, such as news, arts & culture, sports, and opinions.  It is distributed on Fridays.

Events and traditions
RUSH: Northwestern's annual student dance concert, RUSH features student-choreographed performances with a cast of more than 100 dancers whose dance experience ranges from 0 to 20 years. RUSH was formed with the belief that anyone can dance as long as they are committed and determined. All who try out are cast, and since its founding in 2004, RUSH has quickly become one of the most anticipated and most popular events at Northwestern.  
As residence life is a big part of campus life at Northwestern College, each residence hall boasts a number of hall-specific traditions.

Academic buildings
 Bultman Center for Health, Physical Education and Intercollegiate Athletics, opened in 1995
 Christ Chapel and DeWitt Music Hall, opened in 1987
 DeWitt Family Science Center, opened in fall 2018
 DeWitt Learning Commons, opened in 2013
 DeWitt Theatre Arts Center, opened in 2004
 Korver Visual Arts Center, opened in 2003
 Rowenhorst Student Center, renovated in 2007
 Van Peursem Hall, renovated in 2020

Administrative facilities
 Ramaker Center, renovated in 2014
 Zwemer Hall, built in 1894 and restored in 1997.  Zwemer is listed in the National Register of Historic Places.

Recognition
 The 2020 edition of America's Best Colleges, published by U.S. News & World Report, ranks Northwestern 6th among 70 Midwestern regional colleges. Northwestern is also one of 31 Best Value Schools.
 Northwestern is listed on the latest President's Higher Education Community Service Honor Roll.  Since 2007, the college has been consistently included on the honor roll because of its strong commitment to community service. NWC students log thousands of hours of service each school year.
 Northwestern is recognized as a Groundwater Guardian Green Site by the Groundwater Foundation. NWC has earned this recognition every year since 2008.

Missions opportunities

Spring Service Partnerships
For college students all over the country, spring break means road trips to big cities and balmy beaches. Northwestern students do that too, but some of them pack a hammer. Northwestern College annually sends more than 200 students, faculty and staff in teams to serve with ministries in the U.S. and around the world. SSP teams have traveled to Nicaragua and the Netherlands, to California, New York, Oklahoma and Florida. Since Hurricane Katrina in 2005, New Orleans and other Gulf Coast communities have been frequent destinations. SSP teams build and repair homes, minister in prisons, tutor at youth centers, serve in soup kitchens, live with residents in homeless shelters and more.

Spring Service Partnerships integrate faith, service and cross-cultural learning within a team setting that also allows for the involvement of faculty and staff. The SSP program benefits both the ministries and the students who serve: The efforts of a variety of ministries are encouraged, supported and helped in tangible ways. In addition, Northwestern students are challenged and strengthened in their faith as they see and experience the gospel being lived out in cultures different than the one in which they live.

Spring Service Partnerships provide students opportunities to participate in mission work taking place domestically and abroad during annual spring breaks in early March.  Students have spent their ten-day breaks serving in city missions, youth hostels, construction sites, disaster relief zones, and low-income schools.

Summer of Service
The Summer of Service (SOS) program at Northwestern College challenges, prepares and encourages students to be effective Christian servants in the world. It also exists to assist and support missionaries and the communities they work in. Each year, 20 to 25 students serve cross-culturally for at least six weeks in the U.S. or overseas. Past participants have traveled to countries like Croatia, India, Ireland, Jamaica, Malawi, Russia, South Africa and Thailand to serve with mission agencies like The Luke Society, Dublin Christian Mission, Pioneers International and TEAM (The Evangelical Alliance Mission). They have worked in hospitals, orphanages and refugee camps; taught Vacation Bible School and English as a second language; and served in sports and hospitality ministries.

Summer of Service team members return from their summer experiences more aware of the world's problems and promises and more equipped to wrestle with biblical applications to what they experienced. Often these students remain involved in service and mission, either full- or part-time after graduating from college.

Recent sites served include

Musical opportunities
Northwestern offers ten unique musical opportunities for students.  Three of these are vocal ensembles and seven are instrumental.  
 Symphonic Band  is a 60-member wind and percussion ensemble. Members of this ensemble hail from across the United States and from as far away as Taiwan. This group plays a diverse repertoire and goes on an annual tour.  Previous tours have taken the group to Spain, Mexico, the Pacific Northwest, Southern California, Venezuela, and Ukraine.
 A cappella Choir  is a 65-member vocal ensemble. Members of this ensemble come from a variety of majors as well as backgrounds. Music is selected from all musical time periods ranging from works by Palestrina to modern pieces by Eric Whitacre. This group has also participated in a performance of Mozart's Requiem. This ensemble's annual tour has taken it to Taiwan, the Czech Republic, Southern California, New York State, and Austria.
 Heritage Singers  is a group selected from the A cappella Choir. This group has performed a full madrigal dinner as well as the comic operetta Die Fledermaus and evening opera  showcase. In addition to these larger productions, the ensemble also performs character pieces and tours with the A cappella Choir each spring. This group has also  performed with the Northwest Iowa Oratorio Chorus in the Messiah (Handel), Haydn's Missa in tempore belli, and J.S. Bach's St John Passion.
 Jazz Band  is a select ensemble consisting of 18 instrumentalists. This group features a variety of jazz styles and composers. This group has been involved in 'Battle of the Bands' with neighboring colleges.
 Chamber Ensembles (Brass Quintet, String Quartet, and Woodwind Quintet)  are groups that involve Northwestern's best musicians in their respective areas. Each ensemble performs at a joint concert each semester and at special events on campus. These events have included the dedication of campus buildings and for the inauguration of President Greg Christy.
 Percussion Ensemble  is a select group of percussion players. This group includes individuals whose primary instrument is percussion as well as wind players, string players, and vocalists who have experience with percussion. This group performs a variety of music ranging from minimalist music to phase music and a variety of other genres.
 The Orchestra  is a group of 25 string players. This group performs several times each year. Music is chosen from earlier periods as well as the 20th century. This group also includes wind players for an occasional performances when the music calls for them.
 Women's Choir  is a group of 40 musicians. This ensemble performs music from the Renaissance through the 20th century. This group also took part in the chorus of Northwestern's Award-Winning Original Musical "Terror Texts".

Athletics
The Northwestern athletic teams are called the Raiders (formerly known as the Red Raiders). The college is a member of the National Association of Intercollegiate Athletics (NAIA), primarily competing in the Great Plains Athletic Conference (GPAC) since the 1992–93 academic year.

Northwestern competes in 20 intercollegiate varsity sports: Men's sports include baseball, basketball, cross country, football, golf, soccer, tennis, track & field and wrestling; while women's sports include basketball, cross country, dance, golf, soccer, softball, tennis, track & field and volleyball; and co-ed sports include cheerleading and eSports.

Facilities
Outdoor sports such as football and track are played at DeValois Stadium. The stadium has a capacity of 3,100 and also hosts track and field events including conference championships, NAIA football playoff games, and marching band events.

National Championship appearances

"*" indicates overtime

The 2001 "double" (men's and women's basketball titles) was the first time that an NAIA school accomplished the feat, and at the time, only the second in collegiate history (Central Missouri State, now known as the University of Central Missouri (located in Warrensburg, Missouri) previously accomplished the feat in 1984; the University of Connecticut would later accomplish the feat in 2004 and 2014).

Free throw record
Deb Remmerde-Leusink, a 2008 Northwestern College graduate, holds numerous NAIA records, including the record for most consecutive in-game free throws in the history of organized basketball. She ended her 133-shot free-throw streak in February 2006. Remmerde later appeared on "The Early Show," where she completed 580 of 585 free-throws, live, in front of a CBS television crew.

Notable people

Alumni
 Bob Boerigter (1970) – Former Northwest Missouri State University athletic director and Mid-America Intercollegiate Athletics Association commissioner.
 Janet Guthmiller (1984) – Dean of the College of Dentistry, University of Nebraska Medical Center, Omaha, NE.
 Kelvin Korver (1972) - Athlete - An American football player who played 3 seasons with the Oakland Raiders.  Korver was drafted in the second round of the 1972 NFL Draft.
 Richard Mouw (1959) – Author and retired president of Fuller Theological Seminary, Pasadena, CA.
 Randy Oostra (1977) – President and CEO of ProMedica Health System in Toledo, OH.
 Bob Vander Plaats (1985) - Teacher, education administrator, CEO, author, former state Republican Party gubernatorial candidate, and political activist.  Vander Plaats is the president and CEO of the Family Leader - a Christian, social action organization.
 David Vellinga (1972) – Retired president and CEO of Mercy Health Network, Des Moines, IA.
 Cora Vander Broek (2000) - Tony Award-nominated actress.
 Zack Leeper (2011-2014) - Professional basketball player in Spain and Germany

Staff and faculty
 Jeff Barker - playwright, retired professor of theatre, named Iowa's Professor of the Year in 2006.
 James Bultman - former college president, later president of Hope College in Holland, Michigan.
 B. D. Dykstra - former professor, pacifist, pastor, and poet.
 Piet Koene - associate professor of Spanish, translation and interpreting, named Iowa's Professor of the Year in 2004.
 A. J. Muste - instructor of classical languages in 1905–06; pacifist, labor, and civil rights activist.

References

External links
 Official website
 Official athletics website

 
Liberal arts colleges in Iowa
Educational institutions established in 1882
Education in Sioux County, Iowa
Buildings and structures in Sioux County, Iowa
1882 establishments in Iowa
Orange City, Iowa
Council for Christian Colleges and Universities
Great Plains Athletic Conference schools
Private universities and colleges in Iowa
Reformed Church in America
Universities and colleges accredited by the Higher Learning Commission